The 2012 Rugby Football League Championship, also known as Co-operative Championship due to sponsorship by The Co-operative Group, was a semi-professional rugby league football competition played in the UK, one tier below the first tier Super League. The two worst performing teams during the season usually are relegated to Championship 1, however for the 2012 season, no relegation took place, due to the expansion of the Championship to 14 teams in 2013. The winners of the division is decided by a play-off system involving the top 6 teams at the end of the regular season with two teams eventually progressing to the Grand Final. The final was won by Sheffield Eagles, who beat Featherstone Rovers 20–16 at the Halliwell Jones Stadium.

There was no automatic promotion from this league to Super League, which uses a licensing system renewed every three years. Qualifying for the Grand Final or winning the Northern Rail Cup is a prerequisite for Championship clubs to be able to apply for a licence in the next round of applications for the 2015–17 seasons.

All of the teams in the 2012 Co-operative Championship also competed in the 2012 Challenge Cup, where they entered in the third round. All of the teams also competed in the 2012 National League Cup which started before the Co-operative Championship with the finals held mid season.

Teams

This year's competition featured mostly the same teams as it did in 2011. The Swinton Lions and Keighley Cougars were promoted from the 2011 Championship 1, Widnes Vikings were promoted into Super League after winning a licence for 2012-14 seasons, while Barrow Raiders were relegated. Toulouse Olympique, who finished second bottom the previous season, decided to withdraw from the competition and return to the French Elite One Championship league. The changes means that 10 teams competed in the 2012 season. This will increase to 14 in the 2013 season, which meant no relegation from the Championship for the 2012 season.

Season standings

This table is correct as of 2 September 2012.
Source: cooperativechampionship.co.uk and BBC Sport.

Classification: 1st on competition points; 2nd on match points difference.
Competition points: For win = 3; For draw = 2; For loss by 12 points or fewer = 1.

Season results

The regular league season sees the 10 teams play each other twice (one home, one away) over 18 matches. The top six teams at the end of the regular season goes through to the play-offs to determine the winners of the Championship.

Playoffs
The Co-operative Championship uses a top 6 play-off system.

Round 1

Sheffield Eagles 42-12 Batley Bulldogs

Halifax 28-24 Keighley Cougars

Round 2

Halifax 12-54 Sheffield Eagles

Featherstone Rovers 32-14 Leigh

Semi Final

Leigh 22-32 Sheffield Eagles

Final

Featherstone Rovers 16-20 Sheffield Eagles

See also
 Co-operative Championship
 2012 Championship 1
 British rugby league system
 Super League
 Rugby League Conference
 Northern Ford Premiership
 National League Cup
 Rugby League Reserve Team Championship

References

External links
Co-operative Championship

2012 in English rugby league
Rugby Football League Championship